Clarence Sims (born November 7, 1934), best known by his stage name, Fillmore Slim, is an American blues vocalist and guitarist with five albums to his credit. During the 1960s and 1970s, he was also a known pimp in San Francisco, referred to several times as "The West Coast Godfather of the Game" and "The Pope of Pimping".

Early life
Born and raised in Baton Rouge, Louisiana, United States, Fillmore began learning about the blues at an early age. "I done lived the blues," he once said in an interview. "The blues is about picking cotton, working in the fields, living in the streets, and you know I did all these things."

In 1955, he moved to Los Angeles to pursue a musical career, playing by himself in the street and later starting a band called Eddy N and The Blues Slayers. During this time he had a relationship with Etta James before she achieved her fame as a blues singer and recorded a few 45 rpm records himself. His most successful record from this time was titled "You Got the Nerve of a Brass Monkey".

Pimping
Fillmore's life took a dramatic turn when one night, while playing a blues bar in Midland, Texas, he noticed a young woman who kept coming in and out of the bar. As he tells it, "Finally, she came up to me and said, "I like you. I want you to have this money." I asked her how she got all that money. She finally told me she was a hooker. I asked her what a hooker did, and she broke it on down for me." Upon returning to California, he relocated to San Francisco, bringing the girl along with him for extra income. He continued working as a musician, playing in Fillmore District clubs like the Trees Pool Hall and the old Fillmore Theater. He even scored gigs opening for B.B. King and Dinah Washington.

Eventually, however, Fillmore found the lure of pimping too strong and effectively left music behind. He built up a stable of prostitutes and had anywhere from ten to twenty two women working Fillmore Street every day. His wardrobe consisted of sharkskin suits, alligator shoes and diamond watches, and he could often be seen cruising up and down Fillmore Street in a new Cadillac. In the documentary American Pimp, Fillmore estimates that, in his entire career as a pimp, he had over 9,000+ prostitutes.

Return to music
Fillmore Slim became friends with Eli's owner Troyce Key, who admired Slim's musical stylings and eventually recorded his first album called Born to Sing the Blues (as Clarence "Guitar" Sims), released in 1987.

In 1996 Fillmore Slim updated/re-released, Born to Sing the Blues, on the Mountain Top label. Several years of touring and playing gigs followed, which led to a record deal in 1999 with Fedora Records and an album called Other Side of the Road, released in 2000. Fillmore has released more albums/CDs in the years since with a trilogy of CDs on Mountain Top Records: The Game, The Legend of Fillmore Slim, and The Blues Playa's Ball; that tell his story in his own words and music. Fillmore Slim's song writing talents, and musicianship have garnered several awards including being inducted into the Bay Area's West Coast Blues Hall of Fame in 2008, and the Lowell Fulson "Jus' Blues" Award in Memphis in 2011. Since his musical resurgence, Fillmore has found his largest fanbase to be in Europe, where he's played the Zurich Blues Festival and the Blues Estafette in Utrecht, Holland, and France, among others.

Discography

The Blues Playa's Ball (2011) 
Track list (Disc 1):
 Funky Wino  
 San Francisco Down On Sixth Street
 Hooker's Game  
 The Last Stage of the Blues
 She's Nasty  
 Rebecca
 I'd Rather Go Blind  
 Bring Back The Funk
 Playing The Blues Around The World  
 Thunder and Lightning
Track list (Disc 2):
 Strip Joint  
 The Ghetto
 Fannie Mae  
 Go Ahead Woman
 Fine French Woman  
 Fillmore's Hood
 Ain't That A Shame  
 Joe Louis Fan
 Playa's Ball  
 I'd Rather Go Blind [Extended Cut]

"Dressed To Kill" single (2009)

The Legend Of Fillmore Slim: Blues Man / King Of The Game (2006)
Track list:
  The Legend Of Fillmore Slim
  Trapped By The Devil
  Nosey Woman
  Love For The Third Time
  Hey Little Brother
  Watch Yo' Self
  Jack You Up
  My Friend Blue
  Vegetable Man Intro
  Vegetable Man
  She Don't Love Me
  Blues From The Heart
  Tired Of My Old Lady
  Legend Of Fillmore Slim Intro

The Game (October 2004) 
Track list:
 The Game [Rap Version]
 Faster Than Time
 Jody
 Down for My Crown
 My First Girlfriend
 Big Brass Monkey
 Can't Get Enough
 Playboy
 Mackin
 Downtown Fresno
 Texas Woman
 The Game [Blues Version]

Funky Mama's House (February 2004)
Track list:
 Funky Mama's House
 Brown Sugar Eyes
 Street Walker
 Tabby Thomas' Place
 Those Lonely, Lonely Nights
 Ya-Ya
 Down At Eli's
 Stagger Lee
 Earl King
 Saturday Night
 I Cross My Heart

Other Side of the Road (2000)
Track list:
  Let's Talk About Love
  Dial 911
  Kicked Out
  The Girl Can't Cook
  Down On The Farm
  Annabelle
  Pretty Baby
  Other Side Of The Road
  Louisiana Scat
  Blue Monday

Born to Sing the Blues (1998)
CD re-release with 7 additional tracks (and 4 omissions from the original vinyl recording). Released as Clarence "Guitar" Sims.

Track list:
 Minding My Own Business
 King Boy
 Better Man
 When I Come Home
 Watchdog
 3rd Rate Love Affair
 Send Her Home
 Broke Baby
 Lonely Heart and Broken Mind
 So Much Trouble
 Body Language
 Things That I Used To Do
 Sims Boogie
 Better Man [Alternate Take]
 Interview: Clarence "Guitar" Sims

It's Going To Be My Time After While (1996)
Released as Fillmore Sims.

Track list:
 I'm Broke Baby
 Slippin' Out
 Slow Blues
 All The People I Could Have Been
 I Hear You Cryin'
 Cuttin-N-Loosen
 It's Going To Be My Time After While
 Instrumental

Born to Sing the Blues (1987)
Original vinyl release. Released as Clarence "Guitar" Sims.

Track list:
 She's Gone
 Reap What You Sow
 3rd Rate Love Affair
 Watchdog
 Don't Treat Me Right Blues
 Things I Used To Do (E. Jones)
 I'll Be A Better Man
 Hard Luck Blues (R. Brown)
 Body Language-
 Lonely Heart & Broken Mind

References

External links
 Fillmore Slim on Myspace
 Allmusic Fillmore Slim
 

American pimps
American blues guitarists
American male guitarists
Living people
1934 births
20th-century American guitarists
20th-century American male musicians